Tom Edwards  ( – 1980) was a Welsh international footballer. He was part of the Wales team that competed in the 1931–32 British Home Championship, playing one match on 31 October 1931 against Scotland. At club level, he played for Linfield.

See also
 List of Wales international footballers (alphabetical)

References

External links
 
 

1906 births
1980 deaths
Welsh footballers
Wales international footballers
Linfield F.C. players
Place of birth missing
Date of death missing
Association football defenders